"The Last Waltz" is a ballad, written by Barry Mason and Les Reed. It was one of Engelbert Humperdinck's biggest hits, spending five weeks at number 1 on the UK Singles Chart, from September 1967 to October 1967, and has since sold over 1.17 million copies in the United Kingdom. In Australia,

Background
The title of the song is something of a double entendre as it refers to both the narrator's first and last dances with the woman he loves: the first dance was the "last waltz" played at the party where the two met, and the final dance signified the end of their relationship after their romance had cooled.

Chart performance
"The Last Waltz" spent nine nonconsecutive weeks at number one.  In the United States, "The Last Waltz" reached number 25 on the Billboard Hot 100 chart and made the top ten of the easy listening chart.

Weekly charts

Year-end charts

Versions
French-language versions, titled "La Dernière Valse", were released by Mireille Mathieu and Petula Clark in 1967. Mireille Mathieu's version spent three weeks at number one in the French pop charts, and also was a hit in Britain, reaching #26. Petula Clark's version entered the French charts in February 1968 and reached number two but did not chart in the UK. It is also included on her album, The Other Man's Grass Is Always Greener (1968). 
In 1968 Québec singer Stéphane released a French cover on his album Stéphane and in 1969 Ginette Reno also released a French version. Total sales of the different versions combined are over eight million copies.
The Austrian singer Peter Alexander took the song as Der letzte Walzer in November 1967 to the top of the German charts. In his home country it only reached number ten.    
The Legendary Rocksteady Guitarist Lynn Taitt made a Rocksteady guitar Instrumental version of the ‘Last waltz’ in 1967, on the Jamaican WIRL record Label-(WL 176).  
Laurel Aitken also made an Instrumental version of the ‘Last Waltz’ in 1968 on the FAB record Label-(Fab 45).  the Roots Reggae Band the Mighty Diamonds also recorded the ‘Last Waltz’ re-titled ‘The Last Dance’ in 1982, on two formats two 12” singles one in Jamaica on the Black Magic Label no matrix, and One on the UK JB Music Label-(JBD 040A), and a 7” pressing on the UK Label KR-(KR-16A).

Popular culture
The song is associated with the English football club Gillingham F.C.

References

External links
Official Engelbert Humperdinck Website
 

Engelbert Humperdinck songs
1967 singles
Number-one singles in Australia
Number-one singles in Belgium
Irish Singles Chart number-one singles
Number-one singles in New Zealand
Number-one singles in South Africa
UK Singles Chart number-one singles
Gillingham F.C.
Petula Clark songs
Songs written by Les Reed (songwriter)
Songs written by Barry Mason
Decca Records singles
1967 songs
Schlager songs
Song recordings produced by Peter Sullivan (record producer)
Parrot Records singles
1960s ballads